KMOZ-FM (92.3 FM) is a radio station broadcasting a country music format. Licensed to serve Grand Junction, Colorado, United States, the station is currently owned by MBC Grand.

History
On August 1, 2013, KKVT and its adult hits format moved to 100.7 FM, swapping frequencies with country-formatted KMOZ-FM.

Translators
In addition to the main station, KMOZ-FM is relayed by an additional 14 translators to widen its broadcast area.

External links

MOZ-FM
Radio stations established in 1960